The
Carpatho-Russian Labour Party of Small Peasants and Landless (Russian: Карпаторусская Трудовая Партия Малоземельных и Безземельных, Karpatorusskaja trudovaja partija malozemelnych i bezzemelnych) was a political party centered in Subcarpathian Rus' region, within the Second Czechoslovak Republic. It was founded in 1919. The party had a 'Greater Russian' orientation. It was led by Andrey Gagatko, who was elected in 1924 to the parliament. The party published Russkaja zemlja.

The party contested the 1924, 1925 and 1935 elections in electoral coalitions with the Czechoslovak National Social Party. In 1929, the party contested elections as part of an electoral bloc led by the Czechoslovak National Democrats.

The party advocated the separation of church and state. It was opposed to the Greek Catholic Church and supported Eastern Orthodoxy.

References

Bibliography 
 

Anti-Catholicism in Eastern Orthodoxy
Eastern Orthodox political parties
Interwar minority parties in Czechoslovakia
Narodniks
Political parties established in 1919
Russian nationalist organizations
Rusyn political parties
Social democratic parties in Europe